Annikki Paasikivi (1898–1950) was a Finnish architect. She was the daughter of Juho Kusti Paasikivi (the seventh president of Finland) and his wife Anna Matilda Forsman. Annikki was the oldest of their four children.

A scholarship fund at Aalto University is named for her. For a time she did a "woman's hour" on Finnish radio. Her two brothers died in World War II from injuries they had received.

References 

1898 births
1950 deaths
20th-century Finnish architects
Finnish women in politics
Finnish women architects
Children of national leaders